Gundam: The Battle Master, later known as Battle Assault, is a series of fighting games released for the PlayStation, PlayStation 2 and Game Boy Advance. The series features mobile suits from several eras of the Gundam metaverse and some non-traditional fighting game elements. Every entry was developed by Bandai in co-operation with Japanese developer Natsume, who also made the 1996 Shin Kidō Senki Gundam Wing: Endless Duel.

Gundam: The Battle Master

Overview
Gundam: The Battle Master is the first game in the series, released for the PlayStation in 1997. Even this first game features the large multi-jointed sprites and 2-screen-high stages that the rest of the series would follow on. The game would also feature its own unique pilots that are exclusive to this game, replacing the regular pilots that are often associated with each mobile suit in the franchise. It includes the following mobile suits from the Universal Century era:

Playable

 FA-010S Full Armor Enhanced ZZ Gundam
 MS-06F Zaku II
 MSM-03C Hygogg
 MSN-02 Zeong
 MSN-04 Sazabi
 NZ-000 Quin Mantha
 PMX-003 The O
 RX-78-2 Gundam
 RX-78GP02A Gundam Physallis
 RX-93 Nu Gundam

Bosses (Non-Playable)

 MA-08 Big Zam
 AMX-002 (AMA-X2) Neue Ziel
 Psyco Gundam Mark III
 Hydra Gundam

Gameplay
Gundam: The Battle Master features gameplay unlike most fighting games, let alone the other games within its series:

 Mobile suit movement is realistically slow.
 Repeated damage to a specific body part on an enemy will result in that part's armor breaking.
 There's no standard "health bar". Instead, a mobile suit has a "temperature bar" that would fill up as it gets hit. When the bar is full, the mobile suit overheats and is knocked down. When a mobile suit overheats four times, it is knocked out and loses the fight.
 The standard punch and kick buttons are complemented by a shoot button (for firing beam rifles or machine guns), a weapon button (beam sabers, heat hawks, etc.), and a thrust button that allows the mobile suit to fly indefinitely. This is similar to Endless Duel, as well as games such as Capcom's Cyberbots.
 Projectiles are unblockable.
 Special moves are limited. A mobile suit will have a rapid fire version of the shoot button and one or two unique moves. All special moves drain a bar below the temperature bar that can only be filled by connecting with melee attacks.
 Some mobile suits can dodge into the background to avoid attacks, while others can erect a beam barrier that can block projectiles (which can be held indefinitely unless hit by a melee attack).
 Bosses are massive and fill up nearly half the screen. They can not be knocked back by any attack unless they overheat.

Gundam: The Battle Master 2 and Gundam: Battle Assault

Gundam: Battle Assault 2 and The Battle

Mobile Suit Gundam Seed: Battle Assault and Mobile Suit Gundam SEED Destiny

In 2004, Mobile Suit Gundam Seed: Battle Assault was released for the Game Boy Advance and featured units exclusively from the then-recent localization of Mobile Suit Gundam SEED. The units included all the Gundams from the show sans the Providence, as well as Rau Le Creuset's CGUE and the Gundam Astray Red Frame. It was released exclusively in the US.

The gameplay for this portable installment is similar to its three PlayStation predecessors, with the difference of being faster and more user-friendly. The player had the option of choosing a manual method for executing special moves or an automatic one (similar to the easy mode of Capcom's Vs. series). The player could also adjust one of three parameters (HP, Phase Shift Armor or Thrust) at the cost of the other.

There was also an updated version of the game focusing on the SEED Destiny sequel series, named simply Mobile Suit Gundam SEED Destiny. Unlike the original game, however, it was released only in Japan and included the original game as an unlockable. This version features all the units from the previous plus the initial suits of the SEED Destiny anime (it lacks GOUF Ignited, Murasame, Dom Trooper, Strike Freedom, Infinite Justice, Destiny, Legend and Akatsuki).

Battle Assault 3 Featuring Gundam SEED

Battle Assault 3 is the fifth game in the series. It was released on the PlayStation 2, four months after the GBA installment. It was the first to feature full 3D graphics and it also focused on units from the Gundam Seed anime, including grunt mobile suits like GINNs. However, the Wing Gundam Zero Custom, Tallgeese III, Burning (God) Gundam and Master Gundam appear as unlockable secret characters. It was only released in the US.

References

External links
 Hardcore Gaming 101: Gundam 2D Fighting Games (Part 3 - GBA Series)

See also
 Shin Kidō Senki Gundam Wing: Endless Duel
 List of fighting games

1997 video games
1998 video games
2002 video games
2004 video games
Bandai games
Gundam video games
PlayStation (console) games
PlayStation (console)-only games
PlayStation 2 games
PlayStation 2-only games
Game Boy Advance games
Game Boy Advance-only games
Fighting games
Video game franchises
Video game franchises introduced in 1997
Video games developed in Japan